The Dominican Republic women's national handball team is the national handball team of Dominican Republic and is governed by the Dominican Republic Handball Federation.

The team won the Bronze medal at the 2011 Pan American Games held in Guadalajara, Mexico.

Results

World Championship
2007 – 22nd
2013 – 23rd

Pan American Championship

Central American and Caribbean Games

Nor.Ca Championship

Caribbean Handball Cup
2013: 2nd

Other tournaments
2017 Women's Four Nations Tournament – 4th
2022 Bolivarian Games –

Current squad
Roster for the 2013 World Women's Handball Championship.

Head coach: Miroslav Vujasinović

References

External links

IHF profile

National team
Women's national handball teams
Handball